This is a table of championship and notable race results achieved by the Forti auto racing team.

* - including points scored for other teams.
† - entered under the "Astra Racing Team" or similar banner.
‡ - entered under both the "Racing Team Astra Marlboro" and "Squadra Forti Corse" banners during the course of the season.
¶ - entered under the "Team Forti Astra" banner.
° - not eligible for points.

Notes and references

Formula One constructor results